Tidarren haemorrhoidale is a species of spider in the family Theridiidae. It is found in a range from the United States to Argentina.

References

Theridiidae
Articles created by Qbugbot
Spiders described in 1880